1954 in professional wrestling describes the year's events in the world of professional wrestling.

List of notable promotions 
Only one promotion held notable shows in 1954.

Calendar of notable shows

Championship changes

EMLL

NWA

Debuts
Debut date uncertain:
Al Tomko
Billy Red Lyons
The Destroyer
Dory Dixon
El Gladiador
Joe Higuchi
Johnny Weaver
Killer Karl Kox
Nick Bockwinkel
René Guajardo
Sandy Scott
February 4  Kurt von Brauner
April  Felipe Ham Lee
July 29  Penny Banner
October 8  Ray Mendoza
October  Toyonobori

Births
Date of birth uncertain:
Haiti Kid
Mike Masters (died in 2022) 
January 1  Danie Voges (died in 2021) 
January 3  Dean Hart(died in 1990)
January 14  Jim Duggan
January 14  Masanobu Fuchi 
January 18  Ted DiBiase
January 22  Tully Blanchard
February 7  Rip Rogers
March 25  Tim White (died in 2022) 
April 10  Paul Bearer(died in 2013)
April 17  Roddy Piper(died in 2015)
April 23  Tony Atlas
May 13  Masakre (died in 2012) 
June 1  Big Bully Busick(died in 2018)
June 5  Mocho Cota(died in 2016)
June 11  Lee Wang-pyo (died in 2018)
July 11  Butch Reed(died in 2021)
July 27  Manny Fernandez 
August 1  Trevor Berbick (died in 2006)
August 5  Matthew Saad Muhammad (died in 2014) 
August 31  Águila Solitaria
September 4  El Signo
September 13  Mike Hogewood (died in 2018) 
September 17  Bill Irwin
September 25  Al Burke 
October 1  Héctor Guerrero
October 17  Black Cat(died in 2006)
November 20  Kyohei Wada 
December 8  Gama Singh
December 28  Lanny Poffo(died in 2023)

Deaths
April 6 - Tiger Jack Fox (47)
September 3  Karl Pojello (61)
September 4  Maurice Tillet (50) 
October 10  Tony Stecher (65)
November 22  Jess McMahon (72)
November 26  Bobby Becker (36)

References

 
professional wrestling